Somewhere to Elsewhere is the fourteenth studio album by American rock band Kansas, released in 2000. It is Kansas' first album to feature the band's original lineup since 1980's Audio-Visions, along with Billy Greer, who joined the band in 1985. Steve Walsh tracked vocals in his home studio while working on his second solo album Glossolalia and did not join the rest of the band at Kerry Livgren's studio. His contribution were solely vocals. Livgren composed all of the album's tracks, and the hidden track "Geodesic Dome" is his first and only lead vocal on a Kansas song. Somewhere to Elsewhere is Kansas' last studio album to feature both Robby Steinhardt, who left the band in 2006 and died in 2021, and Steve Walsh, who left the band in 2014.

Track listing
All songs written by Kerry Livgren.

Personnel
Kansas
Steve Walsh - lead  and backing vocals
Kerry Livgren - guitars, keyboards, producer, engineer, mixing, lead vocals on track 11
Robby Steinhardt - violin, viola, lead and backing vocals
Rich Williams - guitars, producer
Billy Greer - bass guitar, lead and backing vocals
Dave Hope - bass guitar on tracks 2 and 6
Phil Ehart - drums, producer

Additional musicians
Jake Livgren, Jessica Livgren, "Not Man Big Men Chorus" - additional background vocals

Production
Brad Aaron - engineer, mixing

Charts
Album

References

Kansas (band) albums
2000 albums
Magna Carta Records albums